Ben Sharples (born July 22, 1974) is an American actor, screenwriter, producer, and director.  He is known for his role as Jack Hafey in Takashi Shimizu’s horror movie Flight 7500. He is the writer, producer director, and lead actor of the comedy film Gentlemen's Fury.



Early life
Sharples was born in Hollywood, CA. He lived on the island of Kwajalein from ages two to four, then relocated to Manhattan Beach, CA where he grew up. He discovered his love of filmmaking at age 13, when he began making movies with his friends and an RCA camcorder. He pursued his interest further at Crossroads School in Santa Monica, CA, focusing on film studies. He took an acting class on a dare while at the University of California, Berkeley and loved it so much that he went on to drama school at the American Conservatory Theater, graduating from their MFA Program.

Tennis 
An accomplished tennis player, Sharples was awarded Rookie of the Year and Most Valuable Player three years in a row by the Crossroads School tennis team. He finished his junior career ranked in the top twenty in Southern California and went on to play for the U.C. Berkeley men's tennis team for four years. He coached professional tennis player Zack Fleishman at the US Open in 2011.

Career
Before Flight 7500 and Gentlemen's Fury, Sharples played real estate mogul Stephen in the underground romantic comedy hit film X’s & O's, reported by The New York Times to be downloaded over 150,000 times in one week. He also appeared in the season three opening episode of 90210 as a professional tennis player who takes out Teddy Montgomery, as well as in the feature films Alien Abduction and I'll Believe You.  Ben starred in the dark comedy short film Time Capsule, which premiered at the Regards sur le Cinéma du Monde in Rouen, France, and he played a drug addicted thief in the heist short Blue Plate, an official selection of the Downtown Film Festival Los Angeles.

Sharples was the acting coach of streetball player Grayson "The Professor" Boucher on the basketball movie Ball Don't Lie.

Personal life 

On August 14, 2010, Sharples married actress Marissa Hall, whom he met in high school.

Filmography

Film

Television

External links 

 Official website
 Ben Sharples on IMDb

References

1974 births
Living people
American male actors